The 1942 Fordham Rams football team represented Fordham University as an independent during the 1942 college football season. The Rams offense scored 103 points while the defense (due to two separate defensive collapses) allowed 155 points.  Although the Rams bounced back from those losses and ended the season with a winning record, the team finished the year unranked.

This marked the first time Fordham had finished unranked since sports writers began polling in 1935.  Previously Fordham had finished 11th in the 1935 season ending UP poll, 15th in the 1936 season ending AP poll, third in 1937, 15th in 1938, 17th in 1939, 12th in 1940, and sixth in the 1941 season ending AP poll.  Only Duke had finished each of the previous seasons ranked and they too finished the 1942 season unranked.

After the season, Fordham put their football program on hiatus for the duration of World War II.

Schedule

References

Fordham
Fordham Rams football seasons
Fordham Rams football